Vera Martínez Viota (born 13 September 1999) is a Spanish footballer who plays as a defender for Alavés.

Club career
Martínez started her career at Reocín Racing.

References

External links
Profile at La Liga

1999 births
Living people
Women's association football defenders
Spanish women's footballers
Footballers from Santander, Spain
Deportivo Alavés Gloriosas players
Primera División (women) players
Segunda Federación (women) players
SD Reocín (women) players
CDE Racing Féminas players